Ben Malango Ngita (10 November 1993), is a Congolese professional footballer who plays as a striker.

Career statistics

Club

International
Scores and results list DR Congo's goal tally first.

Honours
TP Mazembe
Linafoot: 2016–17, 2018–19
CAF Confederation Cup: 2017
CAF Super Cup runner-up: 2017, 2018

Raja Casablanca
Botola: 2019–20
CAF Confederation Cup: 2020–21
Arab Club Champions Cup: 2019–20
Individual
Linafoot Top Scorer: 2016–17
CAF Confederation Cup Top Scorer: 2017, 2020–21

References

External links

1993 births
Living people
Footballers from Kinshasa
Democratic Republic of the Congo footballers
Democratic Republic of the Congo international footballers
Democratic Republic of the Congo expatriate footballers
AS Vita Club players
TP Mazembe players
Raja CA players
Sharjah FC players
Botola players
UAE Pro League players
Association football forwards
Expatriate footballers in Morocco
Expatriate footballers in the United Arab Emirates
Democratic Republic of the Congo expatriate sportspeople in Morocco
Democratic Republic of the Congo expatriate sportspeople in the United Arab Emirates
21st-century Democratic Republic of the Congo people